The Islington is a live music venue located at 1 Tolpuddle Street, London, England, Prior to new ownership it was called the "North One".

It has become a known venue for national and international touring acts. The venue booking schedule has hosted notable performances from Thurston Moore, Jeffrey Lewis, Matthew Caws(Nada Surf), Ethan Johns Jamie Lawson, Sarah Neufeld (Arcade Fire), Ward Thomas, The Magic Numbers, Minor Alps, Lisa Mitchell, Whyte Horses, Max Cooke, The High Llamas, Cara Dillon, The Barr Brothers, Jamie Lenman, Ben Taylor and Yasmine Hamdan. The venue has hosted profile book launches from David Hepworth, Paul Morley Hunter Davies, Jon Savage

References

Music venues in London